Star Wars: The Old Republic: Revan is part of the Star Wars expanded universe. Written by Drew Karpyshyn and released on November 15, 2011, Revan fills in the gaps between the RPG games Star Wars: Knights of the Old Republic and Star Wars: Knights of the Old Republic II - The Sith Lords, as well as providing a backstory for events in the MMORPG Star Wars: The Old Republic.

Characters
 Revan, Jedi Master (human male)
 Lord Scourge, Sith Apprentice, later the Emperor's Wrath (Sith male)
 Meetra Surik, Jedi Knight (human female)
 Canderous Ordo, Mandalorian mercenary (human male)
 Bastila Shan, Jedi Knight (human female)
 T3-M4, astromech (droid)
 Darth Nyriss, member of the Dark Council (Sith female)
 Sechel, adviser to Darth Nyriss (Sith male)
 Murtog, security chief to Darth Nyriss (human male)
 Darth Xedrix, member of the Dark Council (human male)
 The Sith Emperor, identified as Lord Vitiate (Sith male)
 Vella Ordo, Mandalorian (Female)

Plot
The novel begins two years after the events of Knights of the Old Republic and begins with Revan living on Coruscant, now married to Bastila Shan, on the outs with the Jedi Order and experiencing horrible insomnia due to nightmares he believes are part of his forgotten past as the Sith Lord Darth Revan.  Desperate for information on his past he tries to get in contact with a former subordinate of his from the Mandalorian Wars named Meetra Surik (The Exile, the main character from Knights of the Old Republic II – The Sith Lords) but finds out that she had been dismissed from the Jedi Order and has left Republic space. A meeting with his old friend Canderous Ordo provides Revan with another chance to regain his memories; a group of Mandalorians are searching for the mask of Mandalore The Ultimate, the traditional leader of the Mandalorian people. The mask was taken by Revan after defeating Mandalore and hidden away to prevent the Mandalorians from regrouping and to break their spirit. Before leaving, he learns from Bastila that she is pregnant; despite her protests Revan convinces her to stay as he doesn't know how long he will be gone.

On the planet Dromund Kaas and unbeknownst to the Republic, the Sith Empire has rebuilt itself after being driven away by the Republic a thousand years earlier. A Sith Apprentice named Scourge is caught up in a rivalry between members of the Sith's Dark Council and is eventually employed by Darth Nyriss to root out traitors and threats to her safety. Scourge carries out his duties, despite growing concerns that Nyriss is trying to have him killed. After earning Nyriss's trust by killing Darth Xedrix, the Sith Master confides in Scourge her plan to overthrow the Emperor as she believes he is insane and will bring ruin to the Sith Empire. She takes Scourge to the Emperor's homeworld of Nathema, which he finds completely devoid life and the Force. Nyriss explains that a thousand years ago, a Sith Lord impregnated a farmer's wife who gave birth to the Emperor. Known then as Lord Vitiate, he eventually killed his parents once the truth of his parentage was revealed and through violence and terror eventually drove out the ruling Sith Lord. And after this, he became the new ruler of Nathema. After the Sith Empire lost their war against the Republic it was Lord Vitiate who picked up the pieces and held the Empire together. Scheming to obtain immortality, he and other Sith performed a ritual that killed every living thing on the planet (the other Sith included) and transferred their life energy to Vitiate. Nyriss fears that the Emperor plans to invade the Republic and risk the stability of the Empire as well as the well-being of the remaining Sith species, who were mercilessly hunted down by the Jedi.

After locating Mandalore's mask, Revan learns of Nathema from a recording he left behind that told him that Mandalore the Ultimate was approached by Sith to attack the Republic. Upon arriving at Nathema, Revan's ship The Ebon Hawk is shot down and Revan is captured by Scourge and Nyriss. Revan's droid, T3-M4 manages to eventually repair the ship and head back towards Republic space.

The book then jumps forward three years, right after the events of The Sith Lords. Meetra Surik arrives at the home of Bastila Shan and with T3-M4 in tow show Bastila a recording T3 made of Revan being abducted by Sith. Although jealous of the relationship Meetra and Revan had, she is relieved to hear that Meetra is set on retracing Revan's path and finding him. She arrives on Nathema and after searching through a municipal building learns of Dromund Kaas and sets out for the planet. Arriving on Dromund Kaas, she passes herself off as a mercenary and eventually makes contact with Scourge who after seeing Nathema and talking with Revan has agreed that the Emperor is a danger to the Sith and must be stopped. After leaking information to the Emperor that Nyriss was a traitor, the Emperor decides to purge the entire Dark Council and sets his personal army upon them. During the chaos Scourge and Meetra manage to free Revan from his cell. Meetra gives Revan the mask that he wore during the Mandalorian Wars; upon wearing the mask all of Revan's memories return to him. After the end of the Mandalorian Wars, Revan and his friend Malak went out in search of the Sith Empire, but due to their corruption during the war, they were made susceptible to the Emperor's will and were converted to the Dark Side and sent back to weaken the Republic so the Sith Empire could return and take over, sparking the events of Knights of the Old Republic and The Sith Lords. Meetra and Scourge are attacked by Nyriss, but before she can kill them Revan approaches them and effortlessly kills the Sith Lord by directing her force lightning back into her. This scene tells of Revan's power.

After resting and watching a message from Bastila and his son Vaner, whose name Revan realizes is an anagram of his own name, the three set out to eliminate the Emperor. Scourge, however, has visions after trying to learn the ways of the Jedi, perceives a Jedi Knight and the Emperor. The three fight their way to the Emperor's throne room and Revan engages the Emperor in combat. Meanwhile, Meetra and Scourge fight the guards. The Emperor is frighteningly powerful and nearly overwhelms Revan, and is only stopped when T3 sets the Emperor on fire with his flamethrower. The Emperor directs his lightning at T3, annihilating the faithful little droid. After this, Scourge and Meetra rush to Revan's aid. At this moment Scourge receives another vision; he is seeing the death of the Emperor at the hands of a Jedi Knight, but it is neither Meetra nor Revan. Understanding what needs to be done, Scourge stabs Meetra in the back, killing her instantly. A shocked Revan is distracted by this for a moment, and Vitiate then nearly electrocuted Revan to death. The Emperor demands an explanation from Scourge, and he lies to the Emperor saying this was all a ruse to flush out every traitor in the Empire. Vitiate orders Scourge to finish the job as a test of loyalty. Scourge obeys without hesitation, but is stopped by the Emperor before he can perform the coup de grâce, saying he has proven himself. Vitiate makes Scourge his personal enforcer, the Emperor's Wrath. Revan is placed in a suspension tank where he is constantly interrogated and tortured by the Emperor for information; unknown to the Emperor is that Revan is able to slightly impose his will upon the Emperor and intends to slow down his planned invasion of the Republic as long as he can so Bastila and his son will never see war. Scourge is rewarded with the Emperor's gift of immortality, though it is very painful and eventually robbed him of all feeling.

The book concludes many decades later with an elderly Bastila conversing with her son. They talk of Revan, and Vaner wonders if his father would have been disappointed that he never joined the Jedi Order but went into politics instead. Bastila assures him that he did the right thing, and that despite not knowing Revan's fate she knows he succeeded because they were still alive and the darkness that Revan feared never came to pass. Bastila then goes to sleep, dreaming of her lost husband.

Reception
The Old Republic: Revan reached 8 on the New York Times bestseller list on December 4, 2011.

References

External links

Drew Karpyshyn's Website

2011 Canadian novels
2011 science fiction novels
Star Wars: Knights of the Old Republic novels
Star Wars Legends novels
Canadian science fiction novels
Del Rey books
Fiction about memory erasure and alteration